Year of the Tiger is the debut studio album by American hard rock band Josh Todd and the Conflict, released on September 15, 2017, by Century Media Records.

Track listing

Personnel
Josh Todd – lead vocals 
Stevie D. – guitar, backing vocals 
Gregg Cash - Bass guitar
Sean Winchester – drums

References

2017 debut albums
Century Media Records albums